James Joseph Galvin (August 11, 1907 – September 30, 1969) was a pinch-hitter in Major League Baseball who played briefly for the Boston Red Sox during the 1930 season. (82 k), Galvin batted and threw right-handed. He was born in Somerville, Massachusetts.  

In a two-game career, Galvin went hitless in two at-bats for a .000 average. He also served as a catcher for 10 different Minor League clubs during 10 seasons spanning 1929–1939. 

Galvin died in Marietta, Georgia, at the age of 62.

See also
Boston Red Sox all-time roster

External links
Baseball Almanac
Baseball Reference (MLB)
Baseball Reference (MiLB)
SABR BioProject – Article written by Bill Nowlin

1907 births
1969 deaths
Atlanta Crackers players
Baseball catchers
Baseball players from Massachusetts
Boston Red Sox players
Chattanooga Lookouts players
Fairmont Black Diamonds players
Harrisburg Senators players
Minneapolis Millers (baseball) players
Sportspeople from Somerville, Massachusetts
Providence Grays (minor league) players
Richmond Byrds players
Richmond Colts players
Wilmington Pirates players